Victoria Vale is a community in the Canadian province of Nova Scotia, located in  Annapolis County. It is situated in a valley on North Mountain, at an elevation of 100 m. It is on Nova Scotia Route 362. It was named for Queen Victoria following her silver jubilee in 1862.

References 

Communities in Annapolis County, Nova Scotia